Pedro Itriago Chacín (9 September 1875 – 19 May 1936), was a Venezuelan lawyer, professor, politician and diplomat. He was the Minister of Foreign Affairs of Venezuela from 1921 to 1936.

See also 
Venezuela
Foreign relations of Venezuela 
List of Ministers of Foreign Affairs of Venezuela

References

Further reading
 Biography at Venezuelatuya.com
 Biography by Andrés Scott Peña

  

 

1875 births
1936 deaths
People from Guárico
Venezuelan Ministers of Foreign Affairs
Venezuelan diplomats
20th-century Venezuelan lawyers
Central University of Venezuela alumni
Academic staff of the Central University of Venezuela